Babi Dewet (born December 30, 1986) is a Brazilian novelist and author of the Sábado à Noite Trilogy. Originally a McFly fanfiction, Babi started publishing her work independently after readers' requests and sold 1,000 copies in less than a year. In 2011, her book was picked up by the Generale publishing company, and became a Trilogy with the second volume published in 2013 and the last one in 2014. In 2015, Babi released "Um Ano Inesquecivel" through Gutenberg publishing company alongside popular teen novelists Paula Pimenta, Bruna Vieira and Thalita Rebouças. She wrote a short story about love during autumn, and this book was in a bestselling list for months in Brazil. Her last book trilogy is called "Cidade da Música" and each volume will feature independent stories and characters that live in a classical music conservatory. Babi also hosts pop culture events and has a YouTube channel about books and K-Pop. She is also podcaster in podcast "K-papo" produced by the producer Half Deaf and available on Spotify.

Selected works 
"Sábado à Noite" (independent version), published in 2010.
"Sábado à Noite 1" – published in 2012 by publish company Generale.
"Sábado à Noite 2 – Dos Bailes Para a Fama", published in 2013 by publish company Generale.
"Sábado à Noite 3 – Com Amor e Música" published in 2014 by publish company Generale.
"Um Ano Inesquecível", published in 2015 by publish company Gutemberg.
"Sonata em Punk Rock", published in 2016 by publish company Gutemberg.
"K-pop – Manual de Sobrevivência", published in 2017 by publish company Gutemberg.
"Turma da Mônica Jovem – Uma Viagem Inesperada", published in 2017 by publish company Gutemberg.
"Allegro em Hip-Hop", published in 2018 by publish company Gutemberg.
"Perigo: Garotas Unidas!", published in 2018 by the literary agency Página 7.
"Turma da Mônica Jovem – Um Convite Inesperado", published in 2019 by publish company Gutemberg.
"K-pop – Além da Sobrevivência", published in 2019 by publish company Gutemberg.

References

1986 births
Living people
Brazilian bloggers
Brazilian women novelists
21st-century Brazilian novelists
21st-century Brazilian women writers
Writers from Rio de Janeiro (city)
Brazilian women bloggers